Long Load is a village and parish in Somerset, England, situated on the River Yeo  south of Somerton in the South Somerset district.  The village has a population of 332.

History
It has also been suggested that the name derives from O.E. lad meaning a water-course.

Long Load's association with the river is long standing. A bridge over the river is known to have existed by 1335, while by 1448 there were wharves for the loading and unloading of cargoes from boats using the river. The current five arch bridge has medieval origins, but was rebuilt in the 18th century and widened in 1814 it cost of £452. It is a Scheduled Ancient Monument and has been designated as a Grade II* Listed building.

The river was the subject of the abortive Ivelchester and Langport Navigation in 1795, and although the works were never completed, traffic on the river was sufficient for the coal merchants Stukey and Bagehot to establish a coal yard near the bridge by 1824. Water levels were improved by work on the river below Langport, and the 1841 census records that a salt house had been constructed. By then, 88 households lived in Long Load, including a boatman called William Gillett and his family, while another boatman lived near the bridge. Cargoes arriving at the wharves included slates, bricks, tiles and coal, while the main export was timber.

Governance
The parish council has responsibility for local issues, including setting an annual precept (local rate) to cover the council's operating costs and producing annual accounts for public scrutiny. The parish council evaluates local planning applications and works with the local police, district council officers, and neighbourhood watch groups on matters of crime, security, and traffic. The parish council's role also includes initiating projects for the maintenance and repair of parish facilities, as well as consulting with the district council on the maintenance, repair, and improvement of highways, drainage, footpaths, public transport, and street cleaning. Conservation matters (including trees and listed buildings) and environmental issues are also the responsibility of the council.

The village falls within the Non-metropolitan district of South Somerset, which was formed on 1 April 1974 under the Local Government Act 1972, having previously been part of Yeovil Rural District. The district council is responsible for local planning and building control, local roads, council housing, environmental health, markets and fairs, refuse collection and recycling, cemeteries and crematoria, leisure services, parks, and tourism.

Somerset County Council is responsible for running the largest and most expensive local services such as education, social services, libraries, main roads, public transport, policing and  fire services, trading standards, waste disposal and strategic planning.

It is also part of the Somerton and Frome county constituency represented in the House of Commons of the Parliament of the United Kingdom. It elects one Member of Parliament (MP) by the first past the post system of election.

Religious sites
In 1548 Long Load chapel was first mentioned, when it was one of the tithings of the parish of Martock. The first solid evidence of a church on the present site is a tablet in the vestry dated 1733, which states that lands were added here at that time.

The Anglican parish Christ Church was built in 1854–1856, by Charles Edmund Giles, replacing a chapel on the site which was first recorded 1418.

The church at Long Load is no longer in use as a church by the parish and has now been sold and is in the process of being redeveloped into a family home.

References

External links

Villages in South Somerset
Civil parishes in Somerset